Keith Hall may refer to:

 Keith R. Hall (born 1947), director of the U.S. National Reconnaissance Office
 Keith Hall (economist), director of U.S. Congressional Budget Office
 Keith A. Hall, former Insight Communications executive and presidential elector in the 2004 United States presidential election
 Keith Clifford Hall (1910–1964), British optician, pioneer of contact lenses
 Caskieben, Scottish castle in Aberdeenshire renamed Keith Hall
 Keith Hall (politician) (born 1959), member of the Kentucky House of Representatives
 Keith Hall/Keith Catholic, a school merged into Lowell Catholic High School

See also
 Hall (surname)